V. Sugnana Kumari Deo is an Indian politician from Odisha.  She was first elected to state assembly in 1963 and has won a total of 10 times in her political career. Deo belongs to the royal family of Khallikote and is the daughter-in-law of Raja Ramchandra Mardaja Deo. She was the Pro-tem speaker of the 15th Odisha assembly.

References 

Women in Odisha politics
Biju Janata Dal politicians
Living people
Year of birth missing (living people)